Stefan Schöpf is an Austrian luger who competed in the 1950s. He won two medals in the men's doubles event at the European Luge Championships with a silver in 1956 and a bronze in 1953. Luge is an alpine sport similar to Bobsledding.

References
 List of European luge champions 

Austrian male lugers
Possibly living people
Year of birth missing